Minik may refer to:
 Minik (given name), the given name
 Minik Wallace (ca. 1890 – 1918), an Inuit brought to the United States of America from Greenland along with five other Inuit in 1897 by explorer Robert Peary
 Domingo Pérez Minik (1903–1989), Spanish writer

See also
 Minick (disambiguation)
 Minnick
 Minich
 Minnich